St. Pius X High School (read as "Saint Pius the Tenth") is a Dominican, Catholic co-educational secondary school in Houston, Texas. St. Pius X High School, informally known as St. Pius or SPX, enrolls students in grades 9 through 12 and is administered by the Roman Catholic Archdiocese of Galveston-Houston.

History

St. Pius X High School was founded by the Dominican Sisters of Houston in 1956. The school was named in honor of Pope Pius X, who was canonized by the Roman Catholic Church in 1954. Pope Pius X was born Giuseppe Melchiorre Sarto, and his family name was taken as the name of the school's official yearbook, Del Sarto.  Pope Pius X's nickname, "Beppo," was also chosen as the name of the school's panther mascot.

Principal Diane Larson is scheduled to retire on July 1, 2020, and Rachel Ware is scheduled to replace her.

Athletics
St. Pius X teams are the Panthers. The school's football stadium is named after Gary Kubiak, an alumnus who quarterbacked the team for three consecutive state championships.

Notable alumni
 Justin Anderson (Class of 2011) – MLB baseball player for the Los Angeles Angels 
 Gary Kubiak (Class of 1979) – Former NFL quarterback and head coach
 Gary Majewski (Class of 1998) – Former MLB relief pitcher
 Chris Harrington (Class of 2003) – Former NFL linebacker 
 Jackson Hurst (Class of 1997) – actor
 Kohl Stewart (Class of 2013) – MLB baseball player for the Minnesota Twins
 Norman F. Carnahan (Class of 1960) – American chemical engineer and scientist
Tony Braunagel – musician
Amouranth (Class of 2012) - actress

See also

 List of schools in the Roman Catholic Archdiocese of Galveston–Houston
 Texas Association of Private and Parochial Schools
 Christianity in Houston

References

External links
 St. Pius X High School

Roman Catholic secondary schools in Houston
Educational institutions established in 1956
Private high schools in Houston
1956 establishments in Texas